Petr Chaadaev (born January 21, 1987, Moscow) is a Belarusian ski jumper who has competed since 2001.

Petr made his debut on November 17, 2001. He started in the Nordic Ski WC in Oberstdorf.

On February 10, 2005 he was 56th in the qualification. In the team competition the Belarusian team was 15th. Ivan Sobolev, Dmitry Afanasenko, Maksim Anisimov and Chaadaev came in last.

In this season, in Bad Mitterndorf he jumped a new Belarusian record, his jump was 197.5 metres long. In Torino Olympics 2006, Chaadaev was disqualified in the qualification, and they didn't start a team.

External links
 
 
 

1987 births
Belarusian male ski jumpers
Russian male ski jumpers
Living people
Olympic ski jumpers of Belarus
Skiers from Moscow
Ski jumpers at the 2006 Winter Olympics